The 1975 Long Beach Grand Prix was the inaugural running of the Grand Prix of Long Beach.  The race was held September 28, 1975, on a  temporary street circuit.  It was race 7 of the 1975 SCCA/USAC Formula 5000 Championship. An estimated 65,000 spectators saw Englishman Brian Redman win the race from Australian Vern Schuppan, with Canadian driver Eppie Wietzes finishing third.

Background
In 1974 the city of Long Beach began a billion-dollar redevelopment program of the downtown area. Chris Pook, a British travel agent working in Long Beach, proposed holding a street course race in the vein of the Monaco Grand Prix.  In order to prepare for a Formula One race the following year, the organizers decided to hold a Formula 5000 race that was held at a track in Riverside with an exhibition in Long Beach.

Qualifying
Qualifying times were set in two sessions on Saturday.  Seeded drivers had one 45-minute session and one 1 hour, 15 minute session, while non-seeded drivers had two 45-minute sessions.  Starting positions were set by two heat races, with the finishers from Heat 1 starting in odd positions and Heat 2 in even positions.

Heat races

Race
At the start, Al Unser led from 2nd on the grid.  On lap 3, polesitter Tony Brise had taken the lead and Mario Andretti took over second place.  Brise led until lap 15, when both Andretti and Unser got by.  Brise re-passed Unser on the next lap, and battled with Andretti until he re-took the lead on lap 29.  On lap 33, Andretti retired with transmission problems, and one lap later Brise retired with a broken driveshaft.  Brian Redman took the lead and pulled away to a nearly 30-second victory over Vern Schuppan and Eppie Wietzes.  Redman also clinched the season points championship.

Result

References

Grand Prix of Long Beach
Long Beach Grand Prix
Long Beach Grand Prix
Formula 5000 race reports